The Juvayni family was a Persian family native to the Juvayn area in Khorasan. The most famous members were Shams al-Din Juvayni (d. 1284) and his elder brother Ata-Malik Juvayni (d. 1283). The family was known for patronizing many scholars and poets, such as Saadi Shirazi and Nasir al-Din al-Tusi.

The family claimed ancestry from al-Fadl ibn al-Rabi' (d. 823/4), who had served in high offices under the Abbasid caliph Harun al-Rashid. The family worked for many different dynasties during its heyday, such as the Ziyarids, Seljuks, Khwarazmians, and the Ilkhanate.

Notable members

al-Juwayni, Sunni Shafi'i jurist and mutakallim theologian
 Muntajab al-Din Badi Juvayni, divan-i insha (royal secretariat) of Ahmad Sanjar
 Baha al-Din Muhammad ibn Ali Juvayni, poet during the reign of the Khwarazmshah Il-Arslan
 Shams al-din Muhammad ibn Muhammad Juvayni, state treasurer (mustawfi) of the Khwarazmshah Ala al-Din Muhammad II and his son Jalal ad-Din Mingburnu
 Baha al-Din Muhammad ibn Muhammad Juvayni, bureaucrat under the Khwarazmian and Ilkhanate dynasties
 Ata-Malik Juvayni, Ilkhanate governor of Iraq
 Shams al-Din Juvayni, sahib-i divan (vizier and minister of finance) of the Ilkhanate from 1263 to 1284
 Baha al-Din Muhammad Juvayni, Ilkhanate governor of Persian Iraq and Yazd
 Sharaf al-Din Harun Juvayni, poet and governor of Ilkhanate Anatolia

References

Sources